Krustpils Station is a railway station serving the city of Jēkabpils in southeastern Latvia. The station is located in the historic Krustpils part of the city on the right bank of the river Daugava.

The station is an important railway junction. It is located on the Riga–Daugavpils railway line roughly halfway between Riga and Daugavpils, and is the terminus of the Jelgava–Krustpils and Krustpils–Rēzekne railway lines.

References 

Railway stations in Latvia
Railway stations opened in 1861